Too Late to Cry is the 1977 second and final album by the English hard rock group Widowmaker.

Track listing 

"Too Late Too Cry" (Daisley)
"The Hustler" (Daisley, Grosvenor)
"What a Way to Fall" (Daisley)
"Here Comes the Queen" (Grosvenor)
 "Mean What You Say" (lyrics: Butler, music: Langton)
"Something I Can Do Without" (lyrics: Daisley, music: Daisley, Grosvenor)
"Sign The Papers" (lyrics: Butler, music: Daisley)
 "Pushin' 'n' Pullin'" (John Farnham)
 "Sky Blues" (lyrics: Butler, music: Daisley, Nichols, Grosvenor)

Personnel 

 John Butler – vocals, harmonica, keyboards
 Ariel Bender – guitar
 Huw Lloyd-Langton – guitar
 Bob Daisley – bass
 Paul Nichols – drums

Additional personnel
 Danny Styles – Hammond B-3 organ
 Miguel Barradas – steel drums on "The Hustler"
 Gered Mankowitz - photography

Notes

References 
 Joynson, Vernon. The Tapestry of Delights - The Comprehensive Guide to British Music of the Beat, R&B, Psychedelic and Progressive Eras 1963-1976. Borderline (2006). Reprinted (2008).
 Larkin Colin. The Guinness Encyclopedia of Popular Music: Threepenny Opera to ZZ Top
Volume 6. Guinness Publications (1995). 

1977 albums
Albums produced by Chris Kimsey
Jet Records albums
Albums recorded at Olympic Sound Studios